Rhagadostoma is a genus of fungi in the family Nitschkiaceae. All species in the genus are lichenicolous, meaning they live parasitically on lichens.

Species
, Species Fungorum accepts 8 species of Rhagadostoma. The following list of Rhagadostoma species give the name, taxonomic authority (standard abbreviations are used) and year of publication (or transfer into this genus), and host species (or host genus). Host information is from Diederich and colleagues' 2018 review on lichenicolous fungi.
Rhagadostoma boleae  – host: Lecania
Rhagadostoma brevisporum  – Nephroma, Peltigera, Solorina
Rhagadostoma coccifera 
Rhagadostoma collematum  – host: Lathagrium auriforme
Rhagadostoma lichenicola  – host: Solorina
Rhagadostoma pannariae  – host: Pannaria
Rhagadostoma rugosum  – host: Verrucaria nigrescens
Rhagadostoma verrucariarum  – host: Verrucaria

References

Sordariomycetes
Sordariomycetes genera
Taxa described in 1865
Taxa named by Gustav Wilhelm Körber
Lichenicolous fungi